The Boring Lava Field (also known as the Boring Volcanic Field) is a Plio-Pleistocene volcanic field with cinder cones, small shield volcanoes, and lava flows in the northern Willamette Valley of the U.S. state of Oregon and adjacent southwest Washington state. Boring lies southeast of the most dense cluster of lava vents. The zone became volcanically active about 2.7 million years ago, with long periods of eruptive activity interspersed with quiescence. Its last eruptions took place about 57,000 years ago at the Beacon Rock cinder cone volcano; the individual volcanic vents of the field are considered extinct, but the field itself is not.

This region sustains diverse flora and fauna within its habitat areas, which are subject to Portland's moderate climate with variable temperatures and mild precipitation.

The Portland metropolitan area, including suburbs, is one of the few places in the continental United States to have extinct volcanoes within a city's limits, and the Boring Lava Field plays an important role in local affairs, including the development of the Robertson Tunnel, recreation, and nature parks. Because of the field's proximity to densely populated areas, eruptive activity would be a threat to human life and property, but the probability for future eruptions affecting the Portland–Vancouver metropolitan area is very low. Boring Lava may also influence future earthquakes in the area, as intrusive rock from its historic eruptions may affect ground movement.

Geography 

The term "Boring Lava" is often used to refer to the local deposits erupted by vents in the field. They are located in the western portion of Oregon. The deposits were given this name by R. Treasher in 1942. In 2002, as geochemical and geochronological information on the Boring deposits accumulated, they were designated part of the larger Boring Lava Field. This grouping is somewhat informal and is based on similarities in age and lithology.

The Boring Lava deposits lie west of the town of Boring. The collection includes more than 80 small volcanic edifices and lava flows in the Portland–Vancouver metropolitan area, with the possibility of more volcanic deposits buried under sedimentary rock layers. The borders for the Boring Lava Field group are clear, except on the eastern side where distinguishing between Boring deposits and those from the major Cascade arc are less clear; many geologists have arbitrarily placed the eastern border at a longitude of 122 degrees west.

Physical geography 

The Columbia River flows west from the eastern Portland region, merging with the Willamette near Portland before moving north. Tributaries for the Willamette include the Pudding, Molalla, Tualatin, Abernethy, and Clackamas Rivers; tributaries for the Columbia River include the Washougal and Sandy Rivers. The Columbia River has significantly shaped the geology of the area.

Multnomah Creek drains from Larch Mountain, one of the volcanic cones in Boring Lava Field. Local streams near the community of Boring receive seepage from the local aquifer. This unit, part of the greater Troutdale sandstone aquifer, is also made of sandstone and conglomerate and bears water well. It also supplies water to domestic wells in the Mount Norway area. Boring Lava is known to have formed intrusions into local sedimentary rock, and thus it may guide flow of groundwater locally.

Portland's climate is moderate, with long growing seasons, moderate rainfail, mild winters, and warm, dry summer seasons. The area has more than 200 frost-free days annually. Prevailing winds originate from the south during winter and from the northwest during the summer season, with the exception of prevailing winds at the mouth of the Columbia River Gorge, where winds predominantly move to the east. The southern winds have the highest velocities of the three, only rarely occurring with potentially destructive force.

Ecology 

The Portland area has a moderate climate, and precipitation is not typically very heavy, allowing for vegetation, which can hamper fieldwork in the area. Many forests that covered the area were partly cleared for agriculture, timber, or cemetery applications in the early 20th century. These cleared and burned land plots sustain rich stands of secondary forest, featuring gorse, huckleberry, nettles, poison oak, salal, and blackberry. Myriad species of fern, as well as rapid-growth deciduous trees like alder and vine maple are also frequent. Forests support stands of Douglas fir, western hemlock, western redcedar, Pacific dogwood, bigleaf maple, Oregon ash, red alder, cascara buckthorn, Pacific madrone, and Oregon white oak; within swamps and moist areas in creeks, the shrub Devil's club can be observed. Other trees that sometimes dominate forest areas include black cottonwood and red alder. Forest communities have many additional shrubs including Indian plum, western hazel, and snowberry. Ground layer plants include the herbaceous sword fern and stinging nettle.

In contemporary times, clearing of forests for housing development have left about half of the Boring Lava region still forested. As a result, water quality has decreased due to higher sedimentation and turbidity, and flooding has worsened over time. Streams within the area are of either first or second order, with moderate to low flows and average gradients between 10 and 12 percent. Cool and clear, many sustain macroinvertebrates, and a smaller number support amphibians and fish. The riparian zones in the Lava Field area host diverse species, and they are influenced by uplands that serve as migration connections for birds, mammals, reptiles, and some amphibians.

The United States Fish and Wildlife Service provided a list of potentially threatened or endangered species in the Boring Lava area, labeling them "sensitive" species. Among plant species, they determined the following species to be sensitive: white top aster, golden Indian paintbrush, tall bugbane, pale larkspur, peacock larkspur, Willamette daisy, water howellia, Bradshaw's lomatium, Kincaid's lupine, Howell's montia, Nelson's checkermallow, and Oregon sullivantia. For animal and marine life, northwestern pond turtles, Willow flycatchers, long-eared myotises, fringed myotises, long-legged myotises, Yuma myotises, Pacific western big-eared bats, and northern red-legged frogs have been identified as species of concern; pileated woodpeckers, bald eagles, cutthroat trout, and coho salmon are also considered sensitive.

History 

The nearby Portland area was inhabited by the Chinook people, though much of the local indigenous culture is poorly understood as a result of disturbance of archeological sites and artifacts by erosion and human development. Oral history, limited archeological evidence, and ethnographic research inform current knowledge about local Native American communities. The area surrounding Portland constituted one of the most densely populated communities in the Pacific Northwest, made up predominantly of Chinook people including the Multnomah and the Clackamas. In 1805 and 1806, Meriwether Lewis and William Clark documented villages and encampments near what is now East Portland, trading with members of the community and describing their plank houses, language, customs, and material culture. Chinookian villages married amongst themselves and with members of the Tualatin tribe as well as the coastal Tillamook people. They imported slaves, traded among villages, and acted as intermediaries for the English and American fur trade. They also developed skill as craftspeople in making clothing, baskets, tools, and architecture. Local indigenous populations were greatly reduced after forced displacement and disease, but a small Native American community persists in Multnomah County.

The Portland area has historically been a center for trade since it was founded in 1845. With time, commerce has diversified. Iron mining and smelting was common between 1867 and 1894, with paper mills becoming established as an industry in 1885. Plants manufacturing cement and conducting aluminum reduction, and shipyards can be found in the region. Industrial chemical production represents an important industry in Portland. Most of these industries rely on resources outsourced from other areas, except for the paper industry; business is driven by low power costs and the local industrial mineral market. Other important manufacturing industries in the nearby region include food processing and logging.

In 1893 the Kelly Butte Natural Area was formed by a petition from the Portland City Council. Historically, it sustained a quarry, prompting the creation of the Kelly Butte Jail, which used prisoner labor (under guard supervision) to gather crushed rocks for building roads in Portland until the 1950s. In general, rocks from the Boring Lava Field have been used for masonry projects including retaining walls, garden walls, and rock gardens, especially oxidized and scoriaceous rocks. Despite the prevalence of quarrying activity in historical times, there is no ongoing mineral or aggregate resource mining near the Boring Lava Field.

In 1952, after a local vote, the Kelly Butte Civil Defense Center was built between 1955 and 1956, costing about $670,000. It was known throughout the United States as a model facility for local governments, and in 1957, the docudrama A Day Called X included footage of the Defense Center. The center was left obsolete after a 1963 Portland City Council vote to abolish it passed; in 1968, just one permanent employee remained. Eventually the building was converted into an emergency services dispatch center from 1974 through 1994, when it was abandoned due to rising costs for renovation and space limitations. That same year the building was vacated, and then it was sealed off in 2006. A sixty-bed isolation hospital operated at Kelly Butte from September 1920 until 1960, supporting patients with communicable disease. A  water tank stood in the area from 1968 through 2010, when it was replaced with a  underground reservoir that cost $100 million, despite opposition from local environmental groups like the Friends of the Reservoirs. Historically, the park has also housed a police firing range, and Kelly Butte remains a recreational space today, administered jointly by Portland Parks and Recreation and the Portland Water Board.

In 1981, the Portland city government built a reservoir at the north end of Powell Butte (part of the Boring Lava Field), which still serves the city. In 1987, Portland government created Powell Butte Nature Park, covering  of meadows and forest within the city. Planning started in 1995 for a second water reservoir in the area, which was built between 2011 and 2014. With the new reservoir came improvements to the Powell Butte park, including resurfaced and realigned trails, reduced environmental impacts, better accessibility measures, and reduction of steep grades. The government also built a visitor center, caretaker's house, public restrooms, maintenance yard, and a permeable parking area that permitted filtration of rainwater through asphalt to an underground stone bed, where it could be absorbed by the soil and then into the nearest aquifer.

Built between 1993 and 1998, the Robertson Tunnel runs for  through the Tualatin Mountains. Located  underground, it is the deepest train station in North America. The tunnel displays a core that exhibits Boring Lava deposits. For the first  of the tunnel, the core shows Boring lava flows with cinder, breccia, and loess dated from 1.47 million to 120,000 years ago, which have been deformed by the Sylvan fault. It is of Quaternary age and lacks surface expression, possibly as a result of its extensive burial by loess along its length.

They have an organizational website and publish a bi-annual newsletter called the Tabor Times. Membership requires dues, and they also rely on donations and a gift shop for financial support.

In September 2017, the Hogan Butte Nature Park opened in the city of Gresham, encompassing an area of  that includes the extinct Boring Lava Field volcano Hogan Butte. This park opened after more than 25 years of processing, supported by a 1990 bond from the city and two regional Metro bonds. Collaborators for opening the park include the U.S. Forest Service, local citizens, Metro, The Trust for Public Land, and the Buttes Conservancy organization.  Gresham is one of just a few places in the United States with volcanoes contained in its city limits. Mount Sylvania and Mount Scott lie within the limits of Portland, in the southwestern and southeastern parts of the city, respectively.

Geology 

There are 90 volcanic centers within a  radius of Troutdale and more than 32 vents within a  radius of Kelly Butte. Mostly small cinder cone vents, these volcanoes also include some larger lava domes from shield volcanoes at Mount Sylvania, Highland Butte, and Larch Mountain. The Global Volcanism Program reports that the field includes somewhere between 32 and 50 shield volcanoes and cinder cones, with many vents concentrated northwest of the town of Boring.

Regional setting 

It marks one of five volcanic fields along the Quaternary Cascade arc, along with Indian Heaven, Tumalo in Oregon, the Mount Bachelor chain, and Caribou in California. Like the Cascade Range, the Boring field was also generated by the subduction of the oceanic Juan de Fuca tectonic plate under the North American tectonic plate, but it has a different tectonic position, with its eruptive activity more likely related to tectonic rifting throughout the region.

The High Cascades, a segment of the Cascade volcanic arc that includes the Boring Lava Field, is characterized by basaltic lava flows with andesite, tuff breccia, and volcanic ash. The High Cascades may lie over a graben (a depressed block of the Earth's crust bordered by parallel faults), and activity at the Boring field and throughout the Portland area may be associated with deformation of the block. Portland lies within the Portland Basin, part of the forearc (the region between an oceanic trench and the associated volcanic arc) between the Cascades major arc and the Pacific Coast Ranges, which consist of Eocene to Miocene marine sedimentary rock deposits and Eocene intrusions and extrusions of basalt that were emplaced on the Siletz terrane. The eastern boundary for the Portland Basin is the Cascades, while the Tualatin Mountains lie to the west, along an anticline formation that has been changing since the Miocene. The Boring Lava Field sits on the floor of the Portland Basin, residing in the forearc setting between tectonic extension to the south and compression to the north. The uneven distribution of vents within this forearc suggests a local zone of crustal expansion. This northwest trending is consistent with other faults in the nearby area. The Boring Lava Field represents the youngest episode of volcanism within the Cascade forearc, and while there is no evidence that they were associated with a slab window (a gap that forms in a subducted oceanic plate when a mid-ocean ridge meets with a subduction zone and plate divergence at the ridge and convergence at the subduction zone continue, causing the ridge to be subducted), they likely interacted with the regional mantle wedge.

Composition and local setting 
The Boring Lava Field shows a similar composition to the High Cascades that run through Oregon and southern Washington state, with Pliocene to Pleistocene basalt lava flows and breccias. It was active during the late Tertiary into the early Quaternary. Within the field, lava shows a diverse composition overall, varying from low-K, tholeiitic to high-K, calc-alkaline eruptive products. Some of the low-K tholeiite deposits likely originated from vents closer to the High Cascades, and they are overlain by Boring Lava materials. J. M. Shempert, a geologist at Portland State University, proposed that mantle sources for the two different lava types may be different and that the calc-alkaline sources are more refractory.

Like the surrounding High Cascades, Boring Lava Field erupted lava made of olivine basalt and basaltic andesite; these sub-alkaline basalts and basaltic andesite predominate among Boring Lava deposits. The olivine basalt deposits have fine to medium textures, and the basaltic andesite lava flow deposits have relatively little pyroclastic rock in them, suggesting that explosive eruptions were uncommon within the field. Dark gray to light gray in color, Boring Lava produces columnar and platy joints, which can be seen in Oregon east of Portland and in Clark County in Washington state. It is usually phyric, though one sample from Rocky Butte consists of labradorite with olivine phenocrysts that have been transformed to iddingsite. Boring Lava has a more mafic (rich in magnesium in iron) composition than the nearby volcano Mount Hood, but they are similar in age. There is a small amount of andesite in the lavas from the field, mostly erupted from monogenetic vents or Larch Mountain. Sometimes, Boring Lava overlaps with volcaniclastic conglomerate from other Cascade eruptions in Multnomah County and the northern part of Clackamas County. The Boring Lava also contains tuff, cinder, and scoria; it is characterized by plagioclase laths that show a pilotaxitic texture with spaces between them that show a diktytaxitic texture. The Boring Lava exposures show aeromagnetic anomalies with short wavelengths and high amplitudes suggestive of their relatively young geological ages.

These scarps tend to have grabens at their bases and Boring Lava blocks at their tops, and they show variable slide surfaces from hummocky to flat. A number of these exposures show dips up to 35 degrees, as well as minor faults. At the cinder cone in Mount Tabor Park, an outcrop of quartzite-pebble xenoliths (rock fragments enveloped in a larger rock during the latter's development and solidification) can be observed among local cinder specimens, dating from Miocene to Pliocene Troutdale deposits. While the volcanic rock of Boring Lava was being emplaced over rock from the Troutdale formation, there was deformation that uplifted and dropped fault blocks to the southeast of Portland. Along the Washougal River, a large landslide occurred as a result of failure due to the Boring Lava pushing down on rock from the Troutdale formation. Intrusions of Boring Lava formed outcrops at Highland Butte, La Butte, and potentially in the subsurface regions near Aurora and Curtis, and these intrusions have been associated with normal faulting at Parrett and Petes Mountain, Aurora, Curtis, and Swan Island (along the Molalla River). Faults together with igneous intrusions are usually accompanied by stretching and doming as a result of magma influxes or collapses from the evacuation of the magma flows. Similarly, faults north of Oregon City might have resulted from subsidence after magma chambers emptied or lava was extruded as a result of Boring Lava eruptions. Some of the Boring Lava vents cut off hydrogeologic units in the surrounding area.

Eruptive vents on the western edge of the field formed along a fault line that trended to the northeast, located north of present-day Carver. Boring Lava was erupted by vents in the volcanic field, and it has been exposed at elevated topographic levels in intact volcanic cones and dissected lava plains. There is likely more lava deposited under Quaternary sedimentary mantle throughout the region, though activity was confined to a relatively concentrated area.

Subfeatures 

D. E. Trimble (1963) argued that the Boring Lava Field was produced by eruptive activity at 30 volcanic centers; these include shield and cinder cone volcanoes. J. E. Allen reported 95 vents in 1975, dividing them into four clusters: 17 vents north of the Columbia River, 14 vents west of the Willamette River, 19 vents east of the Willamette River and north of Powell Valley Road, and 45 vents east of the Willamette River and south of Powell Valley Road (Highway 26). Of these, 42 were unnamed, and several volcanoes contained multiple vents. Generally, all lava flows in the field can be traced to specific vents in the field, but documented source vents have mostly been confirmed through chemical analysis or petrographic comparisons, with a few exceptions.

The lava flows from Highland Butte and Larch Mountain, both shield volcanoes, encompass a wide area, the Boring Lava deposits averaging thicknesses of  not considering areas next to volcanic cones in the field. Mount Tabor is also prominent in the area, dated by the USGS to 203,000 ± 5,000 years old, as are Kelly Butte, Powell Butte, and Mount Scott. Scott has been dated to 1.6 million years ago.

A series of lava tubes were documented near the Catlin Gabel School along the western slope of the Portland Hills. These formations, created by lava flows cooling at the surface while their hot interior kept draining, were first identified by R. J. Deacon in 1968, then analyzed by L. R. Squier in 1970; they were studied in greater detail by J. E. Allen and his team in 1974. The Catlin Gabel tubes lie among cinder cones and lava flows from the Pliocene to Pleistocene, and they are the oldest known lava tubes in Oregon, older than the Holocene. The tubes were produced by a small vent at the southern end of the northern segment of the field, extending  from its base to the south and then the west. They originated from the uppermost lava flow from a series of eruptions that ran into a valley on the western slope of the Portland Hills. The Catlin Gabel tubes also sit atop  of silt from the Troutdale Formation. The characteristics of the tube system are not well documented, since only the collapsed segments are accessible.

Oregon vents 
The following vents are in Oregon:

Washington vents 
The following vents are in Washington:

Eruptive history 

Eruptions at Boring Lava Field occur in a concentrated manner, often in clusters of three to six vents, as at Bobs Mountain and Portland Hills. These types of vents typically produced similar types of magma in relatively short periods of time, and they also frequently show alignment. Vents in the field have generally produced basalt and basaltic andesite, with some andesitic eruptions, including those that produced the Larch Mountain shield volcano.

Prior to the 1990s, there was little potassium-argon dating data available for the lava field, and despite the field's proximity to an urban area, little was known about its composition until recent years. Weathering, fine grain size, and glassy content further limit argon–argon dating for the field. Recent argon–argon dating suggests that eruptive activity at the Boring Lava Field began between 2.6 and 2.4 million years ago, yielding far-reaching basalt lava flows, the Highland Butte shield volcano, a number of monogenetic vents, and one andesitic lava flow. These took place near the southern Portland Basin, and were followed by about 750,000 years of quiescence. About 1.6 million years ago, eruptive activity resumed to the north of the previously active area, with alkalic basalt lava flows generating the Mount Scott shield volcano. As eruptions shifted to the east over time, the Larch Mountain volcano was produced by eruptions in the foothills of the Cascade Range. Activity spread out over the area, extending to its current expansive state about one million years ago. In addition to spreading out geographically, the lava composition in the field's vents became more diverse. This period continued until about 500,000 years ago, with no activity until about 350,000 years ago, after which activity continued through roughly 60,000 to 50,000 years ago according to several sources, or about 120,000 years ago according to I. P. Madin (2009). R. Evarts and Fleck originally reported that lava flows at the Barnes Road deposit of the field represented the youngest eruptive products in the Boring area, with a radiometric dating age of 105,000 ± 6,000 years. These eruptions followed a relatively even age distribution over time; younger vents and associated deposits lie in the northern portion of the field, while older deposits are confined to the south.

The products of the Boring Lava Field were erupted discontinuously over an erosion surface. Activity took place during the late Tertiary and early Quaternary, in what is now the Portland area as well as the surrounding area, with a particularly concentrated pocket of activity to the east. Nearly all of these eruptions were confined to single vents or small vent complexes, with the exception of a lava plain southeast of present-day Oregon City. Boring Lava generally consists of flowing lava; only one eruptive deposit contains tuff, ash, and tuff breccia, and one vent to the northeast of the Carver area displayed evidence of explosive eruptions that later became effusive.

Recent activity and current threats 
Sometime less than 100,000 years ago, magma at Battle Ground Lake in Washington state interacted with water to form the eponymous maar volcano, destroying a lava flow dated to 100,000 years ago. The last volcanic center to form in the field was Beacon Rock, a cinder cone produced by eruptions about 57,000 years ago, which was eroded by the Missoula Floods to leave only its central volcanic plug. While the known volcanic vents in the Boring Lava Field are extinct, the field itself is not considered extinct. However, the probability for future eruptions in the Portland–Vancouver metropolitan area is "very low". It is rare that more than 50,000 years pass without an eruption in the region; given the past eruptive history of the field, an eruption is predicted to occur once every 15,000 years on average.

About half of the Boring Lava Field eruptions took place in what are today densely populated areas of the Portland–Vancouver metropolitan area. Though the formation of a small cinder cone vent might not extend far beyond its surroundings, depending on location, similar eruptions could lead to deposition of volcanic ash that could lead to serious infrastructural consequences, covering large areas. A larger eruption, like the ones that built Larch Mountain or Mount Sylvania, could span years to decades. It is unclear where exactly a future eruption might take place, but it would probably occur in the northern portion of the field.

Many seismic faults in the northeastern section of the northern Willamette Valley formed as a result of intrusions of Boring Lava, as supported by their orientation, lengths, displacements, age, and proximity to Boring Lava intrusions. Though intrusions from any future eruptions at the Boring field are "probably minimal", Boring Lava might play a role in determining the intensity of ground shaking during future earthquakes in the area.

Recreation 
Trails in the city of Gresham travel over parts of the Boring Lava Field and its cones. Mount Tabor and Powell Butte are better known for their recreational uses than other cones; Powell Butte Nature Park has  of trails. The Mt. Tabor Park is open to bicyclists and pedestrians from 5 a.m. through midnight and to motorized vehicles from 5 a.m. through 10 p.m. each day, except for Wednesdays when the park roads are not open to automobiles. The Hogan Butte Nature Park offers views of Mount Adams, Mount Hood, Mount Rainier, and Mount St. Helens, as well as running trails and sites for picnicking.

In addition to the nature park on Hogan Butte, a number of smaller cinder cones are also publicly accessible. The trail is considered to be of moderate difficulty, and it offers no amenities. It includes the Gabbert Loop Trail, which extends for  through forests of maples, alders, ferns, and firs.

Notes 
 [a]  Evarts et al. (2009) list only 80 centers but acknowledge there are likely more buried vents; Le Corvec et al. (2013) list 88 volcanic centers at Boring Lava Field.
 [b]  Low-K is a geological term used to describe lava with low amounts of potassium, while high-K describes lava enriched in potassium.
 [c]  Refractory refers to any material that does not easily convert from liquid to gas via the process of vaporization, which includes elements and compounds made from metals.

References

Sources 

 
 
.
 
 .
 
 .
 
 
 
 
 
 
 
 .
 
 
 
 
 .
 .
 
 
 
 .
 .
 .

External links
USGS Map of Boring Lava Field

Volcanic fields of Oregon
Volcanic fields of Washington (state)
Subduction volcanoes
Cascade Volcanoes
Extinct volcanoes
Pliocene volcanism
Pleistocene volcanism
Lava fields
Geography of Portland, Oregon